The Beamer Trail is a backpacking trail located on the South Rim of the Grand Canyon National Park, located in the U.S. state of Arizona.

Description
The trail begins at the end of the Tanner Trail, at the confluence of Tanner Creek and the Colorado River.  This confluence created the Unkar Creek Rapids.  From here the trail follows the Colorado north (upstream) to its confluence with the Little Colorado River.  The trail is considered primitive, and some route finding is required.  To the east of the trail is the Palisades of the Desert, a two-thousand foot cliff that showcases the upper portion of the canyon's rock layers.

Camping is not allowed within a ½ mile of the confluence of the Colorado River and the Little Colorado River.  Elsewhere along the trail, at-large camping is allowed by permit only from the park's Backcountry Information Center.

See also
 The Grand Canyon
 List of trails in Grand Canyon National Park

References

External links
 Grand Canyon National Park, official site
 Beamer Trail National Park Service factsheet
 

Hiking trails in Grand Canyon National Park